Giuseppe Enrici (January 2, 1896 in Pittsburgh, United States – September 1, 1968 in Nice, France) was an Italian professional road racing cyclist. The highlight of his career was winning the 1924 Giro d'Italia.

References

1896 births
1968 deaths
Italian male cyclists
Giro d'Italia winners
Sportspeople from Pittsburgh
Cyclists from Pennsylvania
Italian expatriates in the United States